The Stubbies was a surf competition held annually, in about March, at Burleigh Heads, Queensland from 1977 to 1988. The event was named after its sponsor the Stubbies clothing brand and was one of the three major Australian surfing competitions of its day (the other two being the Bells Beach Classic and Surfabout).

History 

The contest was established in 1977, organised that year by surfer Peter Drouyn.  He devised for it the "man on man" heat system where just two surfers competed in each heat (where before four or even six was normal).  Prior to 1977, man on man surfing was devised and successfully conducted by kneeboarders under the direction of Peter Ware and Peter Berry. Maroubra was the site of the annual Sitmar Cruises event. 
The man-on-man system is still used in ASP World Tour contests today.

Winners 

{|border="1" cellpadding="2"
| Year || Winner
|-
| 1977 || Michael Peterson
|-
| 1978 || Wayne "Rabbit" Bartholomew
|-
| 1979 || Mark Richards
|-
| 1980 || Peter Harris
|-
| 1981 || Mark Richards
|-
| 1983 || Martin Potter
|-
| 1986 || Tom Curren
|}

References 
Surf Contests at surfresearch.com.au
 Mark Richards: A Surfing Legend, authorised biography by David Knox, 1992, 
 Sean Doherty, MP: The Life of Michael Peterson, HarperCollins, 2004, .

Specific

Surfing competitions
Sport on the Gold Coast, Queensland
Surfing in Australia
Burleigh Heads, Queensland
1977 establishments in Australia
1988 disestablishments in Australia